The historic U.S. Route 66 (US 66, Route 66) ran east–west across the central part of the state of New Mexico, along the path now taken by Interstate 40 (I-40). However, until 1937, it took a longer route via Los Lunas, Albuquerque, and Santa Fe, now roughly New Mexico State Road 6 (NM 6), I-25, and US 84. Large portions of the old road parallel to I-40 have been designated NM 117, NM 118, NM 122, NM 124, NM 333, three separate loops of I-40 Business, and state-maintained frontage roads.

It is one of the roads on the Trails of the Ancients Byway, one of the designated New Mexico Scenic Byways.

History

Route 66 in New Mexico was marked over portions of two auto trails — the National Old Trails Road from Arizona via Albuquerque and Santa Fe to just shy of Las Vegas, and one of the main routes of the Ozark Trails network from that point into Texas. The state had taken over maintenance of these roads under several numbers: NM 6 from Arizona to Los Lunas, part of NM 1 through Albuquerque and Santa Fe to near Las Vegas, NM 56 to Santa Rosa, the short NM 104 to Cuervo, and part of NM 3 to Texas. While NM 56 and NM 104 were completely absorbed by US 66, NM 6 was reassigned to a route splitting from US 66 (old NM 6) at Laguna and heading straight east through Albuquerque, Moriarty, and Palma to US 66 at Santa Rosa. Except between Albuquerque and Moriarty, where it formed part of US 470, this was an unimproved road.

New Mexico had long been controlled politically by the Santa Fe Ring, a group of businesspeople and officials with close ties to the Republican Party. In 1924, Democrat Arthur Thomas Hannett was unexpectedly elected for a single term (1925–1927) as governor. Blaming the Republican establishment in Santa Fe for his defeat, Hannett used the lame duck remainder of his term to force through a sixty-nine mile cutoff from Santa Rosa directly to Albuquerque, bypassing Santa Fe entirely. The hastily constructed new road opened January 3, 1927, while incoming governor Richard Dillon was still trying to get construction stopped. Dillon was replaced by Arthur Seligman, a Democrat, in 1931.

This new NM 6 was approved as a future realignment of Route 66 by 1932, and in 1933, a new bridge over the Rio Puerco opened. Once paving was completed in 1937, with AASHO approval given on September 26, 1937, Route 66 was moved to this shorter route, known as the Laguna Cut-off west of Albuquerque and the Santa Rosa Cut-off east of Albuquerque. The bypassed roads became NM 6 once again to the west and part of US 84 to the east.

Route description
From the Arizona state line to the Grants area the landscape is mountainous, and US 66 meanders around I-40. It also passes through some Indian reservations. At Laguna, New Mexico is the Laguna Indian Pueblo.

At Mesita, the highway originally followed what is now NM 6 to east of I-25 at Los Lunas. It passed through Albuquerque from south to north along Fourth Street, part of the historic El Camino Real de Tierra Adentro (El Camino Real). The highway is now replaced with I-25 through Santa Fe to, almost, Las Vegas (Historic 66 turns south before reaching Las Vegas), though several old sections exist which are barely (if at all) driveable. From south of Las Vegas back to I-40, the road has been replaced with US 84. When I-40 was established, it bypassed the main parts of towns.

The later, and more popular, alignment, continued straight west to Albuquerque, becoming Central Avenue through the city. While the former US 66 through Albuquerque is now owned and maintained by the city of Albuquerque, a few US-66/BUSINESS I-40 signs remain along Central Avenue in the downtown area. East of Albuquerque, US 66 is now NM 333 all the way to Moriarty. A stretch of NM 333 in Tijeras is a musical road, with rumble strips that play "America the Beautiful". I-40 east of Moriarty to Santa Rosa was built by adding a second set of lanes to US 66. East of Santa Rosa, US 66 is now largely frontage roads for I-40 or business loops for Santa Rosa and Tucumcari. At San Jon, the original alignment (now gravel) continues to the Texas state line at the historic ghost town of Glenrio. A later alignment is the north frontage road for I-40.

Major intersections

Structures

The New Mexico Madonna of the Trail is one of a dozen monuments (one in each state  on the National Old Trails Road) commemorating the hardships of early pioneer travellers. She stands on US 66 in Albuquerque. Albuquerque is also home to the 1927 Art Deco themed KiMo Theater and the first modern suburban shopping mall in New Mexico, Nob Hill.

Historic districts
Fort Wingate, an abandoned military installation east of Gallup, traces its history to attempts in the 19th century to forcibly displace Navajo to native reservations. It later served as a line of defense against the Apache. Closed in 1912, it reopened briefly to house prisoners during both world wars.

The Barelas-South Fourth Street Historic District is a collection of commercial buildings from various eras in a formerly Hispanic residential neighborhood in Albuquerque. Eras represented include the arrival of the Atchison, Topeka and Santa Fe Railway and the later construction of US 66.

The Park Lake Historic District is a 25-acre municipal park on a lake in Santa Rosa in addition to the natural Blue hole lake coming from the vast underground water system. Constructed under the Works Progress Administration between 1934 and 1940, the park was a make-work project during the Great Depression.

Restaurants
The historic Jones Motor Company building in Albuquerque, originally a motorcar dealership, has been re-purposed to house the local Kelly's Brew Pub.

Service and filling stations
Richardson's Store in Montoya, a 1901 railroad town, initially provided provisions for Rock Island Railroad workers and ranchers. When Route 66 came to town, the store carried groceries and auto supplies. It closed after I-40 bypassed the community.

Roy T. Herman's Garage and Service Station in Thoreau was moved in 1937 from Grants, where it had originally been established in 1935. The routing of Route 66 had moved, so the station moved with it to keep its Route 66 clientele.

Trading posts
New Mexico is home to the Native American Pueblo of Santo Domingo (Kewa Pueblo) in Santo Domingo and the Pueblo of Laguna in Laguna. Roadside merchants on Route 66 often based their stores on the design of the early trading posts which originally served the native community. The De Anza Motor Lodge and the surrounding Nob Hill neighborhood served as a trading post for the Zuni Pueblo in Albuquerque.

Bowlin's Old Crater Trading Post, Bluewater has long been closed and vacant. Originally a native trading post, its proprietors established a modern chain of highway service centers. Albuquerque's 1939 Maisel's Indian Trading Post, which once employed hundreds of native craftspeople, was reopened in the 1980s and remains in operation today.

Camps, motor courts, and motels

Various towns and cities quickly established roadside motel strips to accommodate a burgeoning traffic from Route 66 travelers.

Tucumcari had long advertised "2000 motel rooms" (later "1200 motel rooms" due to the construction of I-40, diminishing visitor population) on roadside signage for hundreds of miles along US 66 using the slogan "Tucumcari tonite!" At least one historically restored Tucumcari Boulevard motel, the 12-room, neon-lit, 1939 Blue Swallow Motel, is listed on the National Register of Historic Places. Another motel recently restored nearby is the Motel Safari. The Motel Safari was built in 1959 by Chester Dohrer and features a mid-century modern retro design with "Doo Wop" or "Googie" styled architecture. Boomerangs, holes in cinder blocks, counter stacked bricks protruding from the façade and whimsical metal cylinders that light up at night, along with its famous camel atop the neon sign, paying tribute to the U.S. Camel Corps that once came through the area in the 1800s on a surveying expedition for a future national road system.

Central Avenue in Albuquerque has many motels from this era, although some (such as the Aztec Motel) have been demolished along with other building to accommodate for modern needs. Historic Albuquerque lodgings from Route 66's heyday include the Luna Lodge, Tewa Motor Lodge, De Anza Motor Lodge and  El Vado Auto Court. Some of these motels are currently closed but are the target of local efforts to ensure their historic preservation. In hopes to keep the this era alive, some hotels including De Anza Motor Lodge and El Vado Motel have been rejuvenated along the historic route 66 in Albuquerque.

The El Rancho Hotel in Gallup has been the temporary home of many movie stars.

Bridges and road segments
The Rio Puerco Bridge, a Parker Through truss bridge crossing the Rio Puerco, was built in 1933. Eleven New Mexico road segments on US 66 are listed on the National Register of Historic Places; some originally incorporated wooden bridges to carry the road through flood plains. Listed road segments include: Glenrio to San Jon; San Jon to Tucumcari; Palomas to Montoya; Montoya to Cuervo; Cuervo to NM 156; Albuquerque to Rio Puerco; Laguna to McCartys; McCartys to Grants; Milan to Continental Divide; Iyanbito to Rehobeth; and Manuelito to the Arizona border.

Related routes
These routes were designated along former alignments of US 66 throughout the state.

State Road 118

State Road 118 (NM 118) is a  state highway in the US state of New Mexico. NM 118's western terminus is at the Arizona–New Mexico border where it continues westward as Grant Road, and the eastern terminus is at Interstate 40 (I-40) northeast of Fort Wingate.  NM 118 follows the routing of the former Historic U.S. Route 66.

State Road 122

State Road 122 (NM 122) is a  state highway in the US state of New Mexico. NM 122's western terminus is at Interstate 40 (I-40) west of Thoreau, and the eastern terminus is at I-40 in Grants.  NM 122 follows the routing of the former Historic U.S. Route 66.  At the September 20, 2018 Transportation Commission meeting the bridge carrying NM 122 over I-40 was dedicated as "Sgt. Jackson Gibson Memorial Bridge" to honor Jackson Gibson for his service as a veteran, community leader and state transportation commissioner.

State Road 124

State Road 124 (NM 124) is a  state highway in the US state of New Mexico. NM 124's western terminus is at NM 117 southeast of Grants, and the eastern terminus is at Interstate 40 (I-40) east of Laguna.  NM 124 follows the routing of the former Historic U.S. Route 66.

State Road 333

NM 333 begins in eastern Albuquerque at an intersection of Tramway Boulevard (NM 556) and Central Avenue, proceeding east on Central, the route of the former U.S. Route 66 (US 66). After a partial interchange with Interstate 40 (I-40), the highway enters the Sandia Mountains through Tijeras Canyon, where it crosses to the north side of I-40 in a diamond interchange. After traveling through Carnuel, it crosses back to the south side of I-40, though this crossing has no interchange.

Before entering the town of Tijeras, there is a former location of a "musical road" feature where rumble strips were arranged to play America the Beautiful for eastbound travelers. Once in Tijeras itself, the highway intersects NM 337, which travels to the southeast, and NM 14, which heads northeast to Santa Fe. Continuing east, NM 333 travels through Sedillo, where it intersects the former NM 306 and NM 217. The highway then leaves Bernalillo County, and enters Santa Fe County and the town of Edgewood, where it intersects NM 344. Shortly thereafter, the highway enters Torrance County and the city of Moriarty, where it ends at an intersection with I-40 Business (I-40 Bus.).

NM 333 follows the routing of the former Historic U.S. Route 66.

See also

 Scenic byways in the United States
 U.S. Route 80 in New Mexico

References

External links

–documentation of historic districts and individual properties along Route 66 on the National Register of Historic Places

 
66
Route 66 in New Mexico
New Mexico Scenic and Historic Byways
Musical roads